The Play-offs of the 2013 Fed Cup Europe/Africa Zone Group III were the final stages of the Group III Zonal Competition involving teams from Europe and Africa. Using the positions determined in their pools, the twelve teams faced off to determine their placing in the 2013 Fed Cup Europe/Africa Zone Group III. The top two teams advanced to Fed Cup Europe/Africa Zone Group II.

Promotion play-offs
The first placed teams of each pool were drawn in head-to-head rounds. The winner of each round advanced to Group II in 2013.

Egypt vs. Moldova

Denmark vs. Liechtenstein

5th to 8th play-offs
The second placed teams of each pool were drawn in head-to-head rounds to find the equal fifth and seventh placed teams.

Malta vs. Ireland

Morocco vs. Madagascar

9th to 12th play-offs
The third placed teams of each pool were drawn in head-to-head rounds to find the equal ninth and eleventh placed teams.

Armenia vs. Kenya

Namibia vs. Norway

Final placements 

  and  advanced to Europe/Africa Group II in 2014.

See also
Fed Cup structure

References

External links
 Fed Cup website

2013 Fed Cup Europe/Africa Zone